Stevo is a masculine given name and nickname, and a surname.

Notable people with the given name include:

 Stevo Bednarsky (born 1998), American soccer player, given name Steven
 Stevo Crvenkovski (1947–2004), Macedonian diplomat
 Stevo Dragišić (born 1971), Serbian politician
 Stevo Glogovac (born 1973), Bosnian Serb footballer, given name Stevan
 Stevo Karapandža (born 1947), Croatian Serb celebrity chef, given name Stefan
 Stevo Macura (born 1952), Croatian Serb rower
 Stevo Nikolić (born 1984), Bosnian Serb football player
 Stevo Pearce (born 1962), British owner of record label Some Bizzare Records, given name Stephen
 Stevo Pendarovski (born 1963), Macedonian politician
 Stevo Rađenović, Croatian Serb politician and fascist
 Stevo Stepanovski (born 1950), Macedonian bibliophile
 Stevo Teodosievski (1924–1997), Macedonian musician
 Stevo Todorčević (born 1955), Serbian-Canadian mathematician
 Stevo Vasojević, a character in Serbian epic poetry based on a 14th-century nobleman
 Stevo Žigon (1926–2005), Slovene-Serbian actor, given name Štefan
 Steve Jocz (born 1981), nicknamed Stevo, member of the band Sum 41
 Steven Ronald Jensen, nicknamed Stevo, member of the band The Vandals 
 Stevica Ristić (born 1983), nicknamed Stevo, Macedonian football (soccer) player currently playing in Korea
 Mike Stephenson (born 1947), nicknamed Stevo, former professional rugby league footballer, now a commentator
 Stevo, a character in the film SLC Punk!
 Stevo Simple Boy (born 1990), Kenyan rapper, given name Stephen
 Stevo the Madman, stage name of Kevin Stephens (born 1984), English footballer

Notable people with the surname include:
 Jean Stevo (1914–1974), Belgian painter and engraver

See also 
 
 Steve O. (disambiguation)
 Stephen (disambiguation)
 Stevović
 Stević

Serbian masculine given names